The  is the 30th edition of the Japan Academy Film Prize, an award presented by the Nippon Academy-Sho Association to award excellence in filmmaking. It awarded the best films of 2006 and it took place on February 16, 2007 at the Grand Prince Hotel New Takanawa in Tokyo, Japan.

Due to agency's policy, Takuya Kimura declined to receive the prize for Outstanding Performance by an Actor in a Leading Role.

Nominees

Awards

References

External links 
  - 
 Complete list of awards and nominations for the 30th Japan Academy Prize - 

Japan Academy Film Prize
2007 in Japanese cinema
Japan Academy Film Prize
February 2007 events in Japan